Theatre of the Unheard is the third solo album by American country musician Darrell Scott, released in 2003 by the Full Light label.

Critical reception

In his review for AllMusic, Ronnie D. Lankford, Jr., writes, "It's easy to lump Darrell Scott with other singer/songwriters. His songs certainly give the impression that he's writing out of personal experience, but his tendency to paint with large brush strokes gives his material universal appeal."

David Whiteis of The Chicago Reader writes, "His recent Theatre of the Unheard (Full Light) revisits a set of tunes he originally cut 12 years ago for a never-released album. In the interim Scott has changed his musical approach, abandoning the melange of honky-tonk tropes, rock rhythms, and jazz colorings on his early recordings for straight-ahead country-rock bombast."

Track listing

Musicians

Darrell Scott – Accordion (Track 12), Banjo (Track 5), Banjolin (Track 6), Bouzouki (Track 2, 4, 8), Dobro (Track 1), 12 String Acoustic Guitar (Track 9, 12), Acoustic Guitar (Track 1-3, 5-6, 10-11), Baritone Acoustic Guitar (Track 4), Electric Guitar (Track 1, 3-6, 8-9, 11-12), Electric Baritone Guitar (Track 2, 7), Mandolin (Track 1-2, 4, 6, 8-9), Pedal Steel (Track 3), Percussion (Track 8), Piano (Track 3, 11), Electric Piano (Track 7, 12), 2nd Solo (Track 6), Solo (Track 12), Lead Vocals (Track 1-2, 4-8, 10-11, 12), Background Vocals (Track 7-8, 12), Weissenborn Slide (Track 11)
Kathy Chiavola – Voice (Track 4)
Jeff Coffin – Flute (Track 4), Baritone Sax (Track 5), Soprano Sax (Track 10), Tenor Sax (Track 11)
Dan Dugmore – Guitar, Electric Guitar (Track 2-3, 5, 7), Electric Rhythm Guitar (Track 8), Lap Steel Guitar (Track 5-6), Pedal Steel (Track 2, 9-11), Solo (Track 3, 5, 7, 10), 1st & 3rd Solo (Track 6)
Stuart Duncan – Fiddle (Track 9)
Jim Hoke – Horn (Track 7)
Kenny Malone – Drums (Track 1-3, 5-8, 10-12), Percussion  (Track 7, 9-11), Tambourine (Track 2), Spoken Word (Track 4), The Beast (Track 12)
Jane Salters – Spoken Word (Track 4)
Jonell Mosser – Voice of Sally (Track 7)
Steve Nathan – Organ (Track 1, 4, 6-8, 10-12)
Dirk Powell – Accordion (Track 8), Fiddle (Track 8), Yells (Track 8)
Suzy Ragsdale – Voice (Track 3, 6-8, 10, 12), Voice of Myrrah (Track 11)
John Cowan – Voice (Track 3, 7-8, 10, 12)
Rodney Crowell – Voice (Track 2)
Wayne Scott – Spoken Word Phone Message (Track 3)
Danny Thompson – Double Bass (Track 1-5, 7, 9-12), Acoustic Bass (Track 6, 8), Vocal "Zock" (Track 5)
Kris Wilkinson – Viola (Track 4, 11)
Andrea Zonn – Violin (Track 4, 12)
John Catchings – Cello (Track 4, 12)

Production

Darrell Scott – Producer, Audio Production, Engineer, Mixing, Liner Notes, Photography
Richard Dodd – Mastering
Miles Wilkinson – Audio Engineer, Engineer, Mixing
Stacy Zaferes – Photography
Sherie René Scott – Photography
Señor McGuire – Photography
Maude Gilman Clapham – Art Direction, Design
Phil Carroll – Settings

Track information and credits adapted from AllMusic. and verified from the album's liner notes.

References

External links
Darrell Scott Official Site

2003 albums
Darrell Scott albums